

Portugal
Angola – José Maria de Sousa Macedo Almeida e Vasconcelos, Governor of Angola (1829–1834)

United Kingdom
Barbados – Sir James Lyon (1829–1833)
 Malta Colony – Frederick Cavendish Ponsonby, Governor of Malta (1827–1835)
 New South Wales 
 Lieutenant-General Ralph Darling, Governor of New South Wales (1825–1831)
 Major-General Richard Bourke, Governor of New South Wales (1831–1837)
 Western Australia – Captain James Stirling, Lieutenant-Governor of Western Australia (1828–1839)

Colonial governors
Colonial governors
1831